Mohd Osman bin Mohd Jailu is a Malaysian politician. He was the Member of Perak State Legislative Assembly for Changkat Jering from 2008 to 2013.

Politics 
Mohd Osman was active in PKR and agreed to the ideology of Anwar Ibrahim. His experience as a leader in the army got him a lot of support in Changkat Jering.

Independent state assemblyman 
Jamaluddin Mohd Radzi, Hee Yit Foong and him has caused the Pakatan Rakyat government to be toppled by being independent politician in the 2009 Perak constitutional crisis. However, they did not join other party to keep themselves away from legal problems.

Election result

References 

21st-century Malaysian politicians
Malaysian Muslims
Former People's Justice Party (Malaysia) politicians
Independent politicians in Malaysia
Members of the Perak State Legislative Assembly
Malaysian people of Malay descent
Living people
Year of birth missing (living people)